Noah Eile (born 17 July 2002) is a Swedish professional football player who plays for Mjällby, on loan from Malmö FF.

Honours

Malmö FF
 Allsvenskan: 2021

References

External links
 Malmö FF profile 
 
 SvFF profile 

2002 births
Living people
Swedish footballers
Sweden youth international footballers
Association football defenders
Malmö FF players
Mjällby AIF players
Allsvenskan players
Sportspeople from Lund